Matt Postlethwaite (born 1 October 1996) is an English rugby union player who plays for Sale Sharks in the Premiership Rugby.

References

External links
Sale Sharks Profile
ESPN Profile
Ultimate Rugby Profile

1996 births
Living people
English rugby union players
Rugby union players from Bradford
Sale Sharks players
Rugby union locks